Yüksel Yeşilova (born 30 October 1968 in Adana, Turkey) is a retired Turkish football player and current coach.

References

External links

1968 births
Living people
People from Adana
Turkish football managers
Turkish expatriate sportspeople in Romania
FC Sportul Studențesc București managers
Turkish expatriate sportspeople in North Macedonia
FK Bregalnica Štip managers